The Seal of American Samoa is based in traditional local design. 

The fly switch (fue) represents wisdom and the staff (To'oto'o) represents authority. Both symbols are used by talking chiefs indicating their rank. The Tanoa (kava bowl) represents service to the chief. The tapa clothed background represents the artistry of the Samoan people. It also includes the date April 17, 1900, which was the date when Samoa became a U.S. territory.  

On Flag Day April 17, 1973, the official seal of American Samoa, with the motto,  (English: "Samoa, Let God Be First"), was dedicated.

The seal was introduced to the U.S. House of Representatives on March 2, 1985, by Delegate Fofó Iosefa Fiti Sunia. Fofo made the request in November 1981. The artwork was performed by the staff of the architect of the capitol.

References

External links
American Samoa tourism agency

American Samoan culture
Politics of American Samoa
American Samoa
American Samoa